Ladies View is a scenic viewpoint on the Ring of Kerry tourist route about  from Killarney along the N71 road to Kenmare, in the Killarney National Park in Ireland.  The Irish Times ranked Ladies View as one of the most photographed places in Ireland,  while the Daily Edge ranked the views amongst Ireland's finest on Instagram. The name Ladies View (sometimes spelt Ladies' View), stems from the admiration of the view given by Queen Victoria's ladies-in-waiting during Victoria's 1861 visit to Ireland.  In October 2017, a tourist couple almost drove their rental car over the edge of the cliff and into the valley below.

The main viewpoint has a small car park, and a café.

Gallery

See also

 Black Valley
 Gap of Dunloe
 Moll's Gap
 Torc Waterfall

References

External links
 LadiesView.com, website of Ladies View Industries, Killarney

Geography of County Kerry
Tourist attractions in County Kerry
Scenic viewpoints
Outdoor structures in the Republic of Ireland